Industrial property is one of two subsets of intellectual property (the other being copyright), it takes a range of forms, including patents for inventions, industrial designs (aesthetic creations related to the appearance of industrial products), trademarks, service marks, layout-designs of integrated circuits, commercial names and designations, geographical indications and protection against unfair competition. In some cases, aspects of an intellectual creation, although present, are less clearly defined. The object of industrial property consists of signs conveying information, in particular to consumers, regarding products and services offered on the market. Protection is directed against unauthorized use of such signs that could mislead consumers, and against misleading practices in general.

The broad application of the term “industrial property” is set out in the Paris Convention, Industrial property legislation is part of the wider body of law known as intellectual property (IP) which refers broadly to the creations of the human mind. IP rights protect the interests of innovators and creators by giving them rights over their creations. The Convention Establishing the World Intellectual Property Organization (1967) does not seek to define intellectual property, but lists the following as protected by IP rights: literary, artistic and scientific works; performances of performing artists, phonograms and broadcasts; inventions in all fields of human endeavor; scientific discoveries; industrial designs; trademarks, service marks, and commercial names and designations; protection against unfair competition; “all other rights resulting from intellectual activity in the industrial, scientific, literary or artistic fields”.

Countries generally have laws to protect IP for two main reasons:
 To  give  statutory  expression  to  the rights  of  creators  and  innovators  in their  creations  and  innovations,  balanced  against  the  public  interest  in accessing creations and innovations;
 To  promote  creativity  and  innovation, so contributing to economic and social development.

History 
The importance of protecting Industrial property was recognized in the Paris Convention for the Protection of Industrial Property in 1883 and the Berne Convention for the Protection of Literary and Artistic Works in 1886. Both treaties are administered by the World Intellectual Property Organization (WIPO).

The World Intellectual Property Organization provides a forum for its member states to create and harmonize rules and practices for protecting intellectual property rights, including industrial property. It assists its member states in developing IP systems through treaty negotiation, legal and technical assistance, and training in various forms, including in the area of enforcement of IP rights. It provides international registration systems for trademarks, industrial designs and appellations of origin, and an international filing system for patents.

Patents for invention 

Patents, also referred to as patents for invention, are the most widespread means of protecting technical inventions. The patent system is designed to contribute to the promotion of innovation and the transfer and dissemination of technology, to the mutual advantage of inventors, users of inventions and the general public. Once a patent is granted by a state or by a regional office acting for several states, the owner of a patent has the right to prevent anyone else from commercially exploiting the invention for a limited period, generally 20 years. The patent applicant must disclose the invention in order to obtain protection, and their rights can be enforced only within the territory in which the patent was granted.

Definitions 
Most laws dealing with the protection of inventions do not actually define what an invention is. A number of countries, however, define inventions as new solutions to technical problems. The problem may be old or new, but the solution, in order to be considered an invention, must be a new one. Merely discovering something that already exists in nature will not generally qualify as an invention; an adequate amount of human ingenuity, creativity and inventiveness must be involved. But an invention need not be technically complex: the safety pin was an invention that solved a “technical” problem.

Exclusive rights 
By granting an exclusive right, patents provide incentives, offering inventors recognition for their creativity and material reward for their marketable inventions. These incentives encourage innovation, which in turn contributes to continued enhancement of the quality of life. In return for the exclusive right, the inventor must adequately disclose the patented invention to the public, so that others have access to the new knowledge, leading to further innovation. The disclosure of the invention is thus an essential consideration in any patent granting procedure. The word “patent”, or “letters patent”, also denotes the document issued by the relevant government authority. In order to obtain a patent for an invention, the inventor, or often the inventor's employer, submits an application to the national or regional patent office concerned. In the application, the applicant must describe the invention in detail and compare it with previous existing technologies in the same field in order to demonstrate that it is new.

Patentability 
Not all inventions are patentable. Patent laws generally require that an invention fulfill the following conditions, known as the requirements or conditions of patentability:

 Patentable subject matter: The invention must fall within the scope of patentable subject matter as defined by national law. This varies from one country to another. Many countries exclude from patentability such subject matter as scientific theories, mathematical methods, plant or animal varieties, discoveries of natural substances, methods for medical treatment (as opposed to medical products), and any invention where prevention of commercial exploitation is necessary to protect public order, morality or public health.
 Industrial applicability (utility): The invention must be of practical use, or capable of some kind of industrial application.
 Novelty: The invention must show some new characteristic that is not known in the body of existing knowledge (referred to as prior art) in its technical field.
 Inventive step (non-obviousness): The invention must show an inventive step that could not be deduced by a person with average knowledge of the technical field.
 Disclosure of the invention: The invention must be disclosed in a clear and complete manner in the patent application to be carried out by a person skilled in the art (a person conversant in the field of technology concerned).

The conditions of novelty and inventive step must be fulfilled by a certain date, generally the date on which the application is filed. An exception to this rule, covered by an applicant's right of priority, is regulated by the Paris Convention. The right of priority means that, having filed an application in one member country of the Paris Convention, the same applicant (or their successor in title) may, within a specified time period, apply for protection for the same invention in any of the other member countries. These subsequent applications will not be invalidated by reason of any acts occurred between the filing date of the earliest application and the subsequent applications.

For example, if an inventor first files an application for patent protection in Japan, and later a second application, with respect to the same invention, in France, it is sufficient that the conditions of novelty and non-obviousness existed at the date on which the Japanese application was filed. In other words, the later, French application retains priority over any applications relating to the same invention filed by other applicants between the date of the inventor's first and second application. This is subject to the period between the two dates not exceeding 12 months.

Products and processes 
It is customary to distinguish between inventions that consist of products and inventions that consist of processes. The creation of a new alloy is an example of a product invention. The invention of a new method or process of making a known or new alloy is a process invention. The corresponding patents are usually referred to respectively as a product patent and a process patent.

Patentees 
The person to whom a patent is granted is known as the patentee, the owner of the patent or the patent holder. Once a patent has been granted with respect to a particular country, anyone who wishes to exploit the invention commercially in that country must obtain the patentee's authorization. In principle, anyone who exploits a patented invention without the patentee's authorization commits an illegal act. Protection is granted for a limited period, generally 20 years. Once a patent expires, the protection ends, and the invention enters the public domain (also known as being “off patent”). The patentee no longer holds exclusive rights to the invention, which then becomes available for commercial exploitation by others.

Rights conferred by a patent 
The rights conferred by a patent are described in the patent law of the country in which the patent is granted. The patent owner's exclusive rights generally consist of the following: 
 in the case of a product patent, the right to prevent third parties from making, using, offering for sale or selling the product, or importing it for these purposes, without the owner's consent; and 
 in the case of a process patent, the right to prevent third parties from using the process without the owner's consent; and to prevent third parties from using, offering for sale or selling the products obtained directly by that process, or importing them for these purposes, without the owner's consent.

The patentee is not given a statutory right to exploit the invention, but rather a statutory right to prevent others from commercially exploiting it. Patentees may give permission, or grant a license, to other parties to use their inventions on mutually agreed terms. They may also sell their patent rights to someone else, who then becomes the new patent owner. There are certain exceptions to the principle that a patented invention cannot legally be exploited without the authorization of the patent owner. These exceptions take into account the balance between the legitimate interests of the patent holder and those of competitors, consumers and others. For example, many patent laws allow a patented invention to be exploited without the patentee's authorization: private acts for non-commercial purposes; acts for experimental purposes or scientific research; and acts for obtaining regulatory approval for pharmaceuticals. In addition, many laws provide for various situations under which compulsory licenses may be granted and government's use of patented inventions without the authorization of the patent owner may be allowed in the wider public interest.

Utility models 

Although not as widespread as patents, utility models are also used to protect inventions. The rights conferred by utility models are similar to patent rights. Utility models are found in the laws of more than 50 countries, as well as in the regional agreements of the African Regional Intellectual Property Organization (ARIPO) and the African Intellectual Property Organization (OAPI). In addition, certain countries, such as Australia and Malaysia, provide for titles of protection called innovation patents or utility innovations which are similar to utility models. Other countries, like Ireland and Slovenia, have a short-term patent equivalent to the utility model. The expression “utility model” refers to a title of protection for certain inventions, such as inventions in the mechanical field.

Utility model protection is usually sought for technically less complex inventions or for inventions that have a short commercial life. The procedure for obtaining protection for a utility model is usually simpler than that for seeking patent protection. Substantive and procedural requirements under the applicable laws vary widely among the countries and regions with a utility model system; however, utility models usually differ from patents for invention in the following main respects:
 The requirements for acquiring a utility model are less stringent than for patents. While the “novelty” requirement must always be met, that of “inventive step” (or “non-obviousness”) may be much less evident or absent altogether. In practice, protection for utility models is often sought for innovations of an incremental nature that may not meet patentability criteria.
 The maximum term of protectio provided for by law for a utility model is generally shorter than that provided for a patent for invention, usually between 7 and 10 years.
 The fees required for obtaining and maintaining the right are generally lower than those for patents.

Industrial designs 

Industrial designs are applied to a wide variety of industrial products and handicrafts. They refer to the ornamental or aesthetic aspects of an article, including compositions of lines or colors or any three-dimensional forms that give a special appearance to a product or handicraft. The design must have aesthetic appeal. Moreover, it must be able to be reproduced by industrial means; this is the essential purpose of the design and the reason the design is called “industrial”. In a legal sense, an industrial design refers to the right granted in many countries, pursuant to a registration system, to protect the original, ornamental and nonfunctional features of a product resulting from design activity. Aesthetic appeal is one of the main factors influencing consumers in their product choice. Where the technical performance of a product offered by different manufacturers is relatively similar, consumers will make their selection based on price and aesthetic appeal.

Aims of industrial design protection 
By rewarding creators for their efforts, industrial design protection also serves as an incentive to invest in design activity. One of the basic aims of industrial design protection is to stimulate the design element of production. Industrial design laws therefore usually only protect designs that can be used in industry, or that can be produced on a large scale. This condition of industrial production is a notable difference between industrial design protection and copyright, since the latter concerns only aesthetic creations. However, in some cases, industrial designs may qualify for protection under copyright, for example where the design can be categorized as a work of applied art.

Originality 
Industrial designs can generally be protected if they are new or original. Designs may not meet these criteria if they do not differ significantly from other existing designs or combinations thereof. In most industrial design laws, designs dictated solely by the article's function are excluded from protection. If the design for an article produced by many manufacturers, such as a screw, were to be dictated purely by the function the screw was intended to perform, then protection for that design would have the effect of excluding all other manufacturers from producing items intended to perform the same function. Such exclusion is not warranted unless the design is sufficiently novel and inventive to qualify for patent protection. In other words, the legal protection offered by industrial designs concerns only the design that is applied to, or embodied in, articles or products. This protection does not prevent other manufacturers from producing or dealing in similar articles or products, as long as these do not embody or reproduce the protected design.

Protections 
Industrial design registration protects against unauthorized exploitation of the design in industrial articles. It grants the owner of the design the exclusive right to make, import, sell, hire or offer for sale articles to which the design is applied or in which the design is embodied. The term for an industrial design right varies from country to country. The usual maximum term is from 10 to 25 years, often divided into terms requiring the proprietor to renew the registration in order to obtain an extension of protection. The relatively short period of protection may be related to the association of designs with more general styles of fashion, which tend to enjoy somewhat transient acceptance or success, particularly in highly fashion-conscious areas such as clothing or footwear.

Integrated circuits 
Although prefabricated components of electrical circuitry have been used in the manufacture of electrical equipment (e.g. radios) for some time, large-scale integration of a multitude of electrical functions in a very small component became possible as a result of advances in semiconductor technology. Integrated circuits are manufactured in accordance with very detailed plans or layout-designs. The layout-designs of integrated circuits are creations of the human mind. They are usually the result of vast investment, in terms both of expertise and financial resources. There is a continuing need for the creation of new layout-designs that simultaneously reduce the dimensions of existing integrated circuits and increase their functions. The smaller an integrated circuit, the less material is needed for its manufacture, and the smaller the space needed to accommodate it. Integrated circuits are used in a wide range of products, including articles of everyday use such as watches, televisions, washing machine sand cars, as well as sophisticated computers and servers.

Although creating a new layout-design for an integrated circuit involves a major investment, it is possible to copy layout designs for a fraction of that cost. Copying may be done by photographing each layer of an integrated circuit and preparing masks for the production of the integrated circuit on the basis of those photographs. The high cost of creating layout-designs and the relative ease of copying them are the main reasons they need protection.

Layout-designs of integrated circuits are not considered industrial designs in the sense described in the laws providing for the registration of industrial designs. This is because they do not determine the external appearance of integrated circuits but rather the physical location, within the integrated circuit, of each element having an electronic function. Moreover, layout-designs of integrated circuits are not normally patentable inventions, because their creation usually does not involve an inventive step – even though it requires a great deal of work by an expert. Furthermore, copyright protection may not apply if national law determines that layout-designs cannot be copyrighted. In response to the uncertainty surrounding the protection of layout-designs, the WIPO Treaty on Intellectual Property in Respect of Integrated Circuits was adopted on May 26, 1989. The Treaty has not entered into force; however, its substantive provisions have, to a large extent, been incorporated by reference in the Agreement on Trade-Related Aspects of Intellectual Property Rights (TRIPS Agreement), concluded in 1994.

Trademarks 

A trademark is a sign, or a combination of signs, that distinguishes the goods or services of one company from those of another. Such signs may use words, letters, numerals, pictures, shapes and colors, or any combination thereof. An increasing number of countries also allow for the registration of less traditional forms of trademarks, such as three-dimensional signs (like the Coca-Cola bottle or Toblerone chocolate bar), audible signs (sounds such as the roar of the lion at the beginning of films produced by MGM), or olfactory signs (such as the smell of a particular type of motor oil or embroidery yarn). However, many countries have set limits on what may be registered as a trademark, generally allowing only signs that are visually perceptible or can be represented graphically. Trademarks are used on goods or in connection with the marketing of goods or services. The trademark may appear not only on the goods themselves but also on the container or packaging in which the goods are marketed. When used in connection with the sale of goods or services, the sign may appear in advertisements, for example in newspapers, on television or in shop windows.

In addition to trademarks identifying the commercial source of goods or services, several other categories of marks exist.

Collective marks
Collective marks are owned by an association, such as an association representing accountants or engineers, whose members use the mark to identify them with a particular level of quality and other requirements set by the association.

Certification marks
Certification marks, such as the Woolmark, are given for compliance with defined standards, but are not confined to any membership of an association.

Service mark
A trademark used in connection with services is called a service mark. Service marks are used, for example, by hotels, restaurants, airlines, tourist agencies, car-rental agencies, laundries and cleaners. All that has been said about trademarks also applies to service marks.

Functions of trademarks
Broadly speaking, trademarks perform four main functions:

 Distinguish the products or services of one company from those of other companies. Trademarks facilitate the choice to be made by consumers when buying certain products or using certain services. The trademark helps consumers to identify a product or service they are already familiar with or one that has been advertised. The distinctive character of a mark must be evaluated in relation to the goods or services to which the mark is applied. For example, the word “apple” or the image of an apple cannot distinguish apples, but it is distinctive for computers. Trademarks not only distinguish products or services as such, they also distinguish them in relation to the company offering the products or services.
 Refer to a particular company, not necessarily known to the consumer, that offers the products or services on the market. Trademarks therefore distinguish products or services from a given source from identical or similar products or services from other sources. This function is important in defining the scope of trademark protection.
 Refer to a particular quality of the product or service for which a mark is used, so that consumers can rely on the consistent quality of the goods or services offered under that mark. This function is commonly referred to as the guarantee function of trademarks. A trademark is not always used by only one company, since the trademark owner may grant licenses to use the trademark to other companies. It is accordingly essential that licensees respect the quality standards of the trademark owner. Moreover, companies often use trademarks for products they acquire from various sources in the course of business. In such cases, trademark owners are not responsible for producing the products, but instead (and this may be equally important) for selecting those that meet their quality standards and requirements. Even where trademark owners are the manufacturers of a particular product, they may use parts they have selected but not produced.
 Promote the marketing and sale of products, and the marketing and provision of services. Trademarks are not only used to distinguish or refer to a particular company or quality, but also to stimulate sales. A trademark used in this way must be carefully selected. It must appeal to the consumer, create interest and inspire a feeling of confidence. This is sometimes called the communication function. The owner of a registered trademark has an exclusive right in respect of the mark: the right to use the mark and to prevent unauthorized third parties from using it, or a confusingly similar mark, so as to prevent consumers and the public in general from being misled. The period of protection varies, but a trademark can be renewed indefinitely on payment of the necessary fees and on condition that the mark is used. Trademark protection is enforced by the courts which, in most systems, have the authority to block trademark infringement.

Trade names 

Another category of industrial property covers commercial names and designations. A commercial or trade name is the name or designation that identifies a company. In most countries, trade names may be registered with a government authority. However, under Article 8 of the Paris Convention, a trade name must be protected without the obligation of filing or registration, whether or not it forms part of a trademark. Protection generally means that the trade name of one company may not be used by another company, either as a trade name or a trade or service mark – and that a name or designation similar to the trade name may not be used by another company if it is likely to mislead the public.

Geographical indications 

A geographical indication is a sign used on goods that have a specific geographical origin and possess qualities or a reputation due to that place of origin. Agricultural products typically have qualities deriving from their place of production and that are influenced by specific local factors, such as climate and soil. Whether a sign functions as an indication is a matter of national law and consumer perception. Geographical indications may be used for a wide variety of agricultural products, such as “Tuscany” for olive oil produced in a specific area of Italy, or “Roquefort” for cheese produced in a certain region of France.

The use of geographical indications is not limited to agricultural products. They may also highlight particular qualities of a product that are due to human factors found in the product's place of origin, such as specific manufacturing skills and traditions. That place of origin may be a village or town, a region or a country. An example of a country geographical indication is “Switzerland” or “Swiss” for products made in Switzerland, in particular watches.

An appellation of origin is a special kind of geographical indication used on products that have a specific quality exclusively or essentially due to the geographical environment in which the products are produced. The term geographical indication encompasses appellations of origin. Examples of appellations of origin protected in states party to the Lisbon Agreement for the Protection of Appellations of Origin and their International Registration are “Habana”, for tobacco grown in the Havana region of Cuba, and “Tequila”, for spirits produced in particular areas of Mexico.

Protections 
Geographical indications are protected in accordance with national laws in a wide range of ways, such as under laws against unfair competition, consumer protection laws, laws for the protection of certification marks or special laws for the protection of geographical indications or appellations of origin. In essence, unauthorized parties may not use geographical indications where that use is likely to mislead the public as to the true origin of the product. Applicable sanctions range from court injunctions preventing unauthorized use to the payment of damages and fines or, in serious cases, imprisonment.

The World Intellectual Property Organization is an international organization dedicated to ensuring that the rights of creators and owners of intellectual property  are protected worldwide, and that inventors and authors are recognized and rewarded. As a specialized agency of the United Nations, the organization provides a forum for its member states to create and harmonize rules and practices for protecting intellectual property rights. Most developed countries have protection systems that are centuries old, while developing countries continue to create legal and administrative frameworks to protect their patents, trademarks, designs and copyright.

Protection against unfair competition 
Article 10 bis of the Paris Convention requires member countries to provide for protection against unfair competition. According to this article, the following acts of competition are considered contrary to honest trade and industry practices: 
 All acts of such a nature as to create confusion with the establishment, the goods or the industrial or commercial activities of a competitor; 
 False allegations in the course of trade of such a nature as to discredit the establishment, the goods or the industrial or commercial activities of a competitor; and 
 Indications or allegations, the use of which in the course of trade are liable to mislead the public as to the characteristics of certain goods. 
Protection against unfair competition supplements the protection of inventions, industrial designs, trademarks and geographical indications. It is particularly important for the protection of knowledge, technology or information that is not protected by a patent but that may be required in order to make best use of a patented invention.

Instruments and international agreements

See also
 Intellectual property organization

Sources

References 

Intellectual property law
Intangible assets
Management cybernetics